Greenwold  may refer to:

in Canada
 Greenwold, Nova Scotia

in the United States
 Greenwold (Dover, Delaware) listed on the National Register of Historic Places listings in Kent County, Delaware

In India
 Greenwold, Ghaziabad, UP